Chang Hao is the name of:

Chang Hao (Go player) (born 1976), Chinese Go player
Chang Hao (windsurfer) (born 1990), Taiwanese windsurfer
Chang Hao (synchronised swimmer) (born 1997), Chinese synchronised swimmer

See also
Zhang Hao (disambiguation) — "Chang Hao" is the Wade–Giles equivalent of "Zhang Hao"